Bart Baker (born May 5, 1986) is an American entertainer, web-based comedian, video producer, singer, rapper, and parody artist. He is best known for making parody videos of notable songs, for which Billboard dubbed him one of the most prolific makers of music parodies.

Baker is prominent on YouTube, where at one point his self-titled channel peaked at 10 million subscribers. Baker is also a top-earning broadcaster on the platforms Vine and Live.ly. His subsequent ventures include appearing in the 2016 film Laid in America, and uploading content onto the social media app Kwai and Douyin, where his English covers of Chinese songs have gained a following.

In 2018, Baker was signed to World Star Hip Hop, with whom he released his debut single "Popper" under the stage name of Lil Kloroxxx.

Early life 
Baker was born in Chicago, Illinois on May 5, 1986. He attended high school at New Trier High School and film school at the University of Miami. After realizing the potential of video sharing on the internet, he started filming comedy videos in his backyard on a green screen. The Lonely Island was described as a 'big inspiration' to Baker when he first started.

Career 
Baker was encouraged when the first video he posted on YouTube, "Look into My Eyes While I Masturbate", about men masturbating in a future world where robots have replaced all women on Earth, quickly received about 100,000 views.  This prompted Baker to decide on making more videos. His second video was a parody. He has said, "I figured if I could do it right, my videos could do amazingly well... people want to subscribe to a channel they know has a certain programming structure. Mine is parody videos, and people love that".
Baker worked with his friend Austin Smith from the channel's launch until early 2011, when the duo mutually decided to part ways. During his time with Smith, they were signed by RKShorts.com, who acted as their sponsor. While with RKShorts, Baker gained popularity on YouTube when he began using elderly men in his videos. Parodies of "Baby" & "Love the Way You Lie" were released during that year's summer and were major hits for his channel, especially for an adolescent audience. When Baker left RKShorts in 2011, he stopped using these old men.

Not long after leaving RKShorts, Baker signed on with Maker Studios in Los Angeles and began recording with them. In 2013, Baker's parody of "Royals" by Lorde was taken down by Matt Pincus, CEO of Songs Music Publishing, for alleged copyright infringement. Baker quickly posted a video accusing Songs Music of not understanding US laws governing fair use and encouraging fans to tweet about it.  A few days later, Songs Music released their take-down and the parody was restored to Baker's channel. It was reported on 26 November 2014 that Baker had reached one billion views in total on YouTube. In 2015, Baker signed with Hollywood talent agency Creative Artists Agency. It was the second time in four months Baker had signed with a major Hollywood talent agency, the first being WME, when he was one of seven people who signed deals at about the same time. As of October 9, 2021, Baker has over 9 million subscribers and 3 billion lifetime views on his YouTube channel. Since starting the channel in 2009, he has created over 100 parody videos that have featured guest stars like Joan Rivers and Stan Lee. Speaking about YouTube, he said, "YouTube is honestly one of the only platforms that has proven it's not going anywhere". On 23 September 2016, it was announced that Baker would feature in a film titled FM starring fellow internet personalities Jason Nash and Brandon Calvillo.

On September 6, 2019, Vice News reported that after YouTube's demonetization of several YouTubers to satisfy family-friendly advertisers, Baker shifted his career to the Chinese market. His works consist of translating and singing Chinese songs on the social media app Kwai, and his English covers of Chinese songs have been gaining a following on Douyin. He moved to Shanghai to further develop his career as an internet content creator in China. Since Baker had moved to the Chinese market following the drastic change of YouTube's policies to satisfy family-friendly advertisers, his channel has reached the end of his subscriber peak, as his number of subscribers had dropped from 10 to 9.91 million (as of September 18, 2022). On August 29, 2021, Baker uploaded his first YouTube video in over 3 years. He announced that he would be returning to the United States in September 2021, and added that he would be able to afford making new content, including occasional parodies, using cryptocurrency. As of January 2023, Baker has not released any new parodies despite his announcement

Other ventures 
In November 2016, Baker released his first non-parody single, titled "Drake". It is also the debut single from his first album, titled Celebritease. He partnered with Music Choice, a multi-platform video and music network, to serve as the exclusive TV distribution partner for his single. The next month, "Kimye", was released as a single from "Celebritease". The album was subsequently released through his own record label alongside indie label 26 Music, a division of 26 Entertainment. The songs featured on the album are all named after celebrities except the final track, "#DWBD (Don't Worry Bout Dat)". On March 18, 2017, the album peaked at number 4 on the Billboard Comedy Albums chart. In summer of 2018, Baker created an official rap persona known as Lil Kloroxxx. The video for his song "Popper" was released on the WorldStarHipHop YouTube channel on July 21. He then went on to release two more songs nearly a month later, "4 Xanny" and "Prom Queen". Online sources have said that Lil Kloroxxx is fake and heavily spoofs off of SoundCloud rappers such as 6ix9ine and Lil Pump, but Baker himself has confirmed that this persona is "real".

Also in 2016, Baker announced he was running for President of the United States by setting up a large billboard in Times Square, dressed in American-flag boxer-shorts. He believed that his presidential candidacy would shed light on the nature of celebrity and how it has influenced the election cycle. In a 2015 livestream podcast, Baker discussed his involvement with "Fuck Cancer", a nonprofit charity that is dedicated to early detection, prevention, and providing support to those affected by cancer, and an online fundraiser where fans could participate to win an appearance in one of his videos while donating money to the cause. The disease has impacted people in his own life including his mother, who survived breast cancer when he was a child.

Filmography

Film

Television

Music videos

Discography

Studio albums

Singles

Parodies

References

External links 
 

1986 births
Living people
Musicians from Chicago
YouTubers from Illinois
American parodists
American people of English descent
Parody musicians
University of Miami School of Communication alumni
American expatriates in China
Comedy YouTubers
Music YouTubers